Bizarre may refer to:
 
Bizarre (rapper) (born 1976), an American rapper and member of hip hop group D12
Bizarre (band), a Spanish rock band
Bizarre (TV series), a Canadian sketch comedy television series
Bizarre (magazine), a sister magazine to The Fortean Times
Bizarre (film), a 2015 French film
Bizarre Records, a record label
Bizarre, a sexual fetish magazine published by John Willie

See also
 Bazaar (disambiguation)
 Bizarre (album)
 Bizarre, Bizarre, a 1937 French comedy film
 Bizarre Creations, a video game developer
 Bizarre Foods with Andrew Zimmern, a television series airing on Travel Channel
 Bizaar, a 2000 album by Insane Clown Posse
 Bizarre Inc, an English house band
 Bizarro (disambiguation)
 Bizzar, a companion 2000 album by Insane Clown Posse
 Bizzaria, a type of hybrid plant
 Some Bizzare Records, a record label